A Christmas Carol is a British-American animated adaptation of Charles Dickens's 1843 novella. The film was broadcast on U.S. television by ABC on December 21, 1971, and released theatrically soon after. In 1972, it won the Academy Award for Best Animated Short Film.

Plot
The place: London. The time: 1843. Ebenezer Scrooge is about to meet the ghosts of Christmas Past, Present and Future to teach him the true spirit of the season. This adaptation includes scenes of miners and sailors singing carols that were left out in previous adaptations.

Cast (voices)
 Alastair Sim as Ebenezer Scrooge
 Michael Redgrave as Narrator
 Michael Hordern as Marley's Ghost
 Diana Quick as Ghost of Christmas Past
 Joan Sims as Mrs. Cratchit
 Paul Whitsun-Jones as Fezziwig/Old Joe
 David Tate as Fred/Charity Man
 Felix Felton as Ghost of Christmas Present
 Annie West as Belle
 Melvyn Hayes as Bob Cratchit
 Mary Ellen Ray as Mrs. Dilber
 Alexander Williams as Tiny Tim (uncredited)

Production
A Christmas Carol was directed by Richard Williams and its visual style is also largely due to Ken Harris, credited as "Master Animator". It starred Alastair Sim as the voice of Ebenezer Scrooge — a role Sim had previously performed in the 1951 live-action film Scrooge. Michael Hordern likewise reprised his 1951 performance as Marley's Ghost in the animated film. Michael Redgrave narrated the story and veteran Looney Tunes animator Chuck Jones served as executive producer. Williams' son Alexander Williams, then aged four, provided the voice for Tiny Tim.

Aesthetics
This adaptation of A Christmas Carol has a distinctive look, created by multiple pans and zooms and by innovative, unexpected scene transitions. The visual style, which is unusually powerful, is inspired by 19th-century engraved illustrations of the original story by John Leech and the pen and ink renderings by illustrator Milo Winter that graced 1930s editions of the book. The intended audience does not include young children, and the film's bleak mood and emphasis on darkness and shadows led some to consider it the most frightening of the many dramatizations of the Dickens classic.

Reception and legacy
Originally produced as a 1971 television special, the quality of the animation on A Christmas Carol was considered so well done (even at the time when it was made) that it was subsequently released theatrically, thereby rendering it eligible for Oscar consideration, and the film did go on to win the Academy Award for Best Animated Short Film a year later. Some industry insiders took issue that a short originally shown on television was given the award, and the Academy responded by changing its policy, disqualifying any future works initially shown on television eligibility.

See also
 List of Christmas films
 List of American films of 1971
 List of British films of 1971
 List of ghost films
 List of adaptations of A Christmas Carol

References

External links
 
 
 A Christmas Carol (1971) on YouTube
 Cels from the Ken Harris website
 Tiny Tim remembered at FLIP Animation Magazine Retrieved January 2013

1971 films
1971 animated films
1971 short films
1971 television specials
1972 films
1972 animated films
1972 short films
1970s American television specials
1970s animated short films
1970s fantasy films
American animated short films
American Broadcasting Company television specials
American Christmas films
British Christmas films
Animated Christmas films
Animated films based on novels
1970s animated television specials
Best Animated Short Academy Award winners
Films based on A Christmas Carol
Films directed by Richard Williams
1970s Christmas films
American Christmas television specials
Animated Christmas television specials
Films produced by Richard Williams (animator)
1970s English-language films
1970s American films
1970s British films
Films set in 1843
Films set in the 1840s